The Swedish Ambassador in Beijing is the official representative of the Government in Stockholm to the Government of the People's Republic of China as well as the Non-Resident Ambassador to Ulaanbaatar (Mongolia).

List of representatives

References 

 
China
Sweden